Srđan Soldatović (born 10 January 1974) is a Serbian retired football goalkeeper. Soldatović now works as a goalkeeping coach.

Born in Ćuprija, Soldatović played for Šumadija 1903, Radnički Kragujevac, Badnjevac, Zvezdara, Železnik, Radnički Niš, and Šumadija 1903, Kragujevac before he joined Javor Ivanjica. While he was with Javor, he was loaned to Radnički Kragujevac and Sloga Požega. He also made 4 Jelen SuperLiga appearance. He retired at the end of 2011, and became goalkeeper coach in Ivanjica. He played 1 match for Smederevo and came out of retirement for a short time, because of problems with deficit players. Later he moved in Tavriya Simferopol.

	FC “Javor”, Ivanjica, Goalkeeper coach of youth categories, 2006  - 2010.
	FC “Javor”, Ivanjica, Coach U-18, Super league of Serbia, 2010/2011
	FC ”Javor“, Ivanjica, Coach U-16,  2010/2011
	FC ”Javor", Ivanjica, Coach U-14,  2009/2010
	FC “Javor”, Ivanjica, Coach U-12, 2008/2009
	An active player and coach in the youth categories of FC “Javor”  Ivanjica  2006-2012.

References

External links
 
 
 
 Srđan Soldatović stats at utakmica.rs 

1974 births
Living people
People from Ćuprija
Association football goalkeepers
Serbian footballers
FK Radnički 1923 players
FK Zvezdara players
FK Železnik players
FK Radnički Niš players
FK Javor Ivanjica players
FK Smederevo players
Serbian SuperLiga players